Enzio may refer to

 Enzio or Enzo of Sardinia (1218–1272), illegitimate son of Holy Roman Emperor Frederick II
 Enzio, legitimate son of Manfred of Sicily by his wife Helena; he was confined to prison his entire life
 Enzio Boldewijn (born 1992), Dutch footballer
 Enzio d'Antonio (1925–2019), Italian Roman Catholic bishop and archbishop
 Enzio von Pfeil, German economist
 Enzio Reuter (1867–1951), Finnish entomologist

Italian masculine given names